Dziekanów  is a village in the administrative district of Gmina Hrubieszów, within Hrubieszów County, Lublin Voivodeship, in eastern Poland, close to the border with Ukraine. The village has a population of 578.

References

Villages in Hrubieszów County